Catrin ferch Owain Glyndŵr (died 1413) was one of the daughters (probably the eldest) of Margaret Hanmer and Owain Glyndŵr, and her marriage to a claimant on the English throne was used by her father to gain support.

Biography
Catrin is one of the children of Owain Glyndŵr about whom most is known. In November 1402, she married Edmund Mortimer, an unransomed hostage who entered into an alliance with her father.

Edmund Mortimer died during the siege of Harlech Castle in 1409, of unknown causes. Catrin was subsequently captured alongside her three daughters. They, as well as her mother and one of her sisters, were taken to the Tower of London. The deaths of Catrin and her daughters are recorded, and their burial at St Swithin's Church in London, but the cause of their deaths is not known.

Legacy 
A memorial to Catrin stands in St Swithin's Church Garden, where the church formerly stood; the statue was designed by Nic Stradlyn-John and sculpted by Richard Renshaw, and was unveiled in 2001 by Siân Phillips.

Her mother's fate is not known; it is known only that Margaret Hanmer outlived Catrin. In 2003 an exhibition was held at the National Library of Wales to celebrate Catrin's legacy, and a short poem was composed in her memory by Menna Elfyn. A play, Catrin Glyndwr by Heledd Bianchi, was premièred in 2004.

Family connections

References

Further reading
R. R. Davies – The Revolt of Owain Glyn Dŵr (OUP, 1995)
Deborah Fisher – Princesses of Wales (Univ of Wales Press, 2005)
Sir J. E. Lloyd – Owen Glendower (1931)
 Charles Parry – The Last Mab Darogan (Novasys, 2010)

Year of birth missing
1413 deaths
Welsh princesses
Mortimer family (English nobility)
Prisoners in the Tower of London
House of Mathrafal
14th-century Welsh people
15th-century Welsh people
14th-century Welsh women
15th-century Welsh women